Medina is a genus of flies in the family Tachinidae.

Species
Medina abdominalis Mesnil, 1971
Medina barbata (Coquillett, 1895)
Medina carbonata Mesnil, 1968
Medina cinctella (Villeneuve, 1950)
Medina collaris (Fallén, 1820)
Medina confinis Ziegler & Shima, 1996
Medina crocea (Villeneuve, 1950)
Medina decellei Verbeke, 1964
Medina denticulata (Villeneuve, 1950)
Medina egregia (Villeneuve, 1950)
Medina expergita (Walker, 1861)
Medina fumipennis Townsend, 1926
Medina fuscisquama Mesnil, 1953
Medina hamata (Wulp, 1890)
Medina lateralis (Villeneuve, 1950)
Medina leskiaeformis Herting, 1973
Medina longipes (Wulp, 1890)
Medina luctuosa (Meigen, 1824)
Medina malayana (Townsend, 1926)
Medina melania (Meigen, 1824)
Medina mira Mesnil, 1977
Medina multispina (Herting, 1966)
Medina nigra Mesnil, 1968
Medina ouelleti (Curran, 1925)
Medina pectinifera Mesnil, 1977
Medina quinteri (Townsend, 1915)
Medina rubricosa (Villeneuve, 1913)
Medina semirufa (Villeneuve, 1950)
Medina separata (Meigen, 1824)
Medina setosella (Villeneuve, 1950)
Medina sopha Mesnil, 1977
Medina spinosa (Coquillett, 1897)
Medina spinulifera Mesnil, 1968
Medina succuba Mesnil, 1977
Medina vidua Mesnil, 1977

References

Diptera of Europe
Diptera of Asia
Diptera of Africa
Diptera of North America
Exoristinae
Tachinidae genera
Taxa named by Jean-Baptiste Robineau-Desvoidy